Upper Pearls is a town in Saint Andrew Parish, Grenada.  It is located towards the northern end of the island, along the east coast.

References 

Populated places in Grenada
Saint Andrew Parish, Grenada